When embedded in an atomic nucleus, neutrons are (usually) stable particles.

The beta decay of the neutron described in this article can be notated at four slightly different levels of detail, as shown in four layers of Feynman diagrams in a section below.

 

The hard-to-observe  quickly decays into an electron and its matching antineutrino. The subatomic reaction shown immediately above depicts the process as it was first understood, in the first half of the 20th century. The boson vanished so quickly that it was not detected until much later.
Later, beta decay was understood to occur by the emission of a weak boson, sometimes called a charged weak current. Beta decay specifically involves the emission of a  boson from one of the down quarks hidden within the neutron, thereby converting the down quark into an up quark and consequently the neutron into a proton. The following diagram gives a summary sketch of the beta decay process according to the present level of understanding.

For diagrams at several levels of detail, see § Decay process, below.

Energy budget
That is the difference between the rest mass of the neutron and the sum of the rest masses of the products. That difference has to be carried away as kinetic energy. The latter number is not well-enough measured to determine the comparatively tiny rest mass of the neutrino (which must in theory be subtracted from the maximal electron kinetic energy); furthermore, neutrino mass is constrained by many other methods.

A small fraction (about 1 in 1,000) of free neutrons decay with the same products, but add an extra particle in the form of an emitted gamma ray:

This gamma ray may be thought of as a sort of "internal bremsstrahlung" that arises as the emitted beta particle (electron) interacts with the charge of the proton in an electromagnetic way. In this process, some of the decay energy is carried away as photon energy. Gamma rays produced in this way are also a minor feature of beta decays of bound neutrons, that is, those within a nucleus.

A very small minority of neutron decays (about four per million) are so-called "two-body (neutron) decays", in which a proton, electron and antineutrino are produced as usual, but the electron fails to gain the 13.6 eV necessary energy to escape the proton (the ionization energy of hydrogen), and therefore simply remains bound to it, as a neutral hydrogen atom (one of the "two bodies"). In this type of free neutron decay, in essence all of the neutron decay energy is carried off by the antineutrino (the other "body").

The transformation of a free proton to a neutron (plus a positron and a neutrino) is energetically impossible, since a free neutron has a greater mass than a free proton. However, see proton decay.

Decay process viewed from multiple levels
Understanding of the beta decay process developed over several years, with the initial understanding of Enrico Fermi and colleagues starting at the "superficial" first level in the diagram below. Current understanding of weak processes rest at the fourth level, at the bottom of the chart, where the nucleons (the neutron and its successor proton) are largely ignored, and attention focuses only on the interaction between two quarks and a charged boson, with the decay of the boson almost treated as an afterthought. Because the charged weak boson vanishes so quickly, it was not actually observed during the first half of the 20th century, so the diagram at level 1 omits it; even at present it is for the most part inferred by its after-effects.

{|  style="text-align:left;vertical-align:bottom;"
|-
|colspan=9| 
|  
|-
| 
| 
| 
| + 
| 
| 
| 
| +   
|  
|   
|-
|colspan=9| 
|
|-
| 
| 
| 
| 
| +   
| 
|
|
| 
|   
|-
|
|
|
|
| 
| 
| 
| +   
| 
|   
|-
|colspan=9|     
| 
|-
| 
| 
| 
| + 
| 
|
|
|
| 
|   
|-
|
|
|
|
| 
| 
|
|  +   
| 
|   
|-
|colspan=9|  
|
|-
| 
| 
| 
| + 
| 
| 
| 
| 
| 
|   
|-
| 
| 
| 
| 
| 
| 
| 
| +   
| 
|   
|}

Neutron lifetime puzzle
While the neutron lifetime has been studied for decades, there currently exists a lack of consilience on its exact value, due to different results from two experimental methods ("bottle" versus "beam").
The "neutron lifetime anomaly" was discovered after the refinement of experiments with ultracold neutrons. While the error margin was once overlapping, increasing refinement in technique which should have resolved the issue has failed to demonstrate convergence to a single value. The difference in mean lifetime values obtained as of 2014 was approximately 9 seconds. Further, a prediction of the value based on quantum chromodynamics as of 2018 is still not sufficiently precise to support one over the other.
As explained by Wolchover (2018), the beam test would be incorrect if there is a decay mode that does not produce a proton. 

Yet another approach similar to the beam method has been explored with the Japan Proton Accelerator Research Complex (J-PARC) but it is too imprecise at the moment to be of significance on the analysis of the discrepancy.

See also
 Halbach array-used in the "bottle" method

Footnotes

References

Bibliography 

Neutron
Radioactivity
Physical phenomena